Schoriella is an extinct genus of trilobites in the family Anomocaridae. The genus lived during the Cambrian Period, which lasted from approximately 539 to 485 million years ago.

References

Cambrian trilobites
Cambrian trilobites of Europe
Cambrian trilobites of Asia
Anomocaridae